Arthezé is a commune in the Sarthe department and Pays de la Loire region of north-western France.

See also
Communes of the Sarthe department

References

Communes of Sarthe